Gene J. Bertoncini (born 6 April 1937) is an American jazz guitarist.

Biography
Bertoncini was born in New York City, where he was raised in a musical family. His father, Mario Bertoncini (1901–1978), played guitar and harmonica. His brother Renny (1934-2023), was a gifted accordion and keyboard player. Gene began playing guitar at age seven and by age sixteen was appearing on television. He graduated from high school and attended the University of Notre Dame, where, in 1959, he earned a Bachelor of Science degree in Architectural Engineering.

Early in life, Bertoncini had lessons with Bob Scilingo and Johnny Smith. After college Bertoncini moved to Chicago where he became immersed in the jazz scene, working with Carmen McRae.  He returned to New York and played with vibraphonist Mike Mainieri and then played in one of Buddy Rich's ensembles.  Bertoncini's career has included playing with Benny Goodman, Wayne Shorter, Hubert Laws, Paul Desmond, Tony Bennett, Lena Horne, Nancy Wilson, Chet Baker, Vic Damone, Ethel Ennis, and Eydie Gorme.

Bertoncini had a long-running duo with bassist Michael Moore. He was part of the staff orchestras on shows featuring Merv Griffin and Jack Paar, and most famously The Tonight Show Starring Johnny Carson. After hearing a Julian Bream record at the advice of Chuck Wayne, Bertoncini began studying classical guitar and brought the instrument into playing jazz.  For some eighteen years, Bertoncini played Sunday and Monday evenings at the Bistro La Madeleine on West 43rd Street in New York City.

Bertoncini has been on the faculties of Eastman School of Music, the New England Conservatory, New York University and the Banff School of Fine Arts in Alberta, Canada. Currently Bertoncini is on the faculty of William Paterson University in Wayne, New Jersey. He is also on the staff of the Tritone Jazz Fantasy Camps.

Discography

As leader
 Evolution (Evolution, 1969)
 Bridges with Michael Moore (GJB Music, 1977)
 The Guitar Session with Jay Berliner, Toots Thielemans, Richard Resnicoff (Philips, 1977)
 Crystal & Velvet with Bobbi Rogers (Focus, 1981)
 O Grande Amor with Michael Moore (Stash, 1986)
 Close Ties with Michael Moore (Musical Heritage Society, 1987)
 Strollin'  with Michael Moore (Stash, 1987)
 Two in Time with Michael Moore (Chiaroscuro, 1989)
 Jiggs & Gene with Jiggs Whigham (Azica, 1996)
 Someone to Light Up My Life (Chiaroscuro, 1996)
 Interplay with Fred Haas (JazzToons, 1997)
 East Meets Midwest with Kenny Poole (J-Curve, 1998)
 Gene Bertoncini with Bill Charlap and Sean Smith (Chiaroscuro, 1999)
 Just the Two of Us with Jack Wilkins (Chiaroscuro, 2000)
 Autumn Leaves at Astley's with Frank Vignola (True Track, 2001)
 Meeting of the Grooves with Frank Vignola (Azica, 2002)
 Acoustic Romance with Akira Tana and Rufus Reid (Sons of Sound, 2003)
 Just Above a Whisper (Stellar Sound, 2005)
 Concerti (Ambient, 2008)
 Smile with Roni Ben-Hur (Motéma, 2008)
 2+2=1 (Blueport, 2009)

As sideman
 Monty Alexander, Spunky (Pacific Jazz, 1965)
 Duke Pearson, Prairie Dog (Atlantic, 1966)
 Meredith D'Ambrosio, Silent Passion (Sunnyside, 1997)
 David Amram, On the Waterfront on Broadway (Varese Sarabande)
 Chet Baker, The Best Thing for You (A&M, 1989)
 Irwin Bazelon, Music of Irwin Bazelon (1992)
 Tony Bennett, A Place Over the Sun (Columbia, 1969)
 Tony Bennett, I've Gotta Be Me (Columbia, 1969)
 Peter Bernstein, Mundell Lowe, Jack Wilkins, We Remember Tal (J-Curve, 1999)
 Phil Bodner, Clarinet Virtuosity: Once More with Feeling! (Arbors, 2006)
 Canadian Brass, Swingtime! (RCA Victor, 1995)
 Earl Coleman, Love Songs (Atlantic, 1968)
 Dolly Dawn, Memories of You (Dawn, 1981)
 Paul Desmond, Bridge Over Troubled Water (A&M, 1970)
 Paul Desmond, Skylark (CTI, 1974)
 Trudy Desmond, Tailor Made (Jazz Alliance, 1992)
 Linda Eder, It's Time (Atlantic, 1997)
 Ronnie Foster, Two-Headed Freap (Blue Note, 1972)
 Nnenna Freelon, Nnenna Freelon (Columbia, 1992)
 Johnny Frigo, Debut of a Legend (Chesky, 1994)
 Astrud Gilberto, Gilberto with Turrentine (CTI, 1971)
 Astrud Gilberto, That Girl from Ipanema (Image, 1977)
 Bob Hammer, Beatlejazz (ABC-Paramount, 1967)
 Jane Harvey, Jane Harvey (RCA 1974)
 Bobbi Humphrey, Flute-in (Blue Note, 1971)
 Bobby Hutcherson, Natural Illusions (Blue Note, 1972)
 Rufus Jones, Five On Eight (Cameo, 1964)
 Roger Kellaway, Meets the Duo Gene Bertoncini and Michael Moore (Chiaroscuro, 1992)
 Rebecca Kilgore, Rebecca Kilgore with the Keith Ingham Sextet (Jump, 2001)
 Morgana King, Miss Morgana King (Mainstream, 1965)
 Morgana King, A Taste of Honey (Mainstream, 1991)
 Peggy King, Oh What a Memory We Made...Tonight (Stash, 1984)
 Peggy King, Peggy King Sings Jerome Kern (Stash, 1985)
 Michel Legrand, After the Rain (Pablo, 1983)
 Michel Legrand, Twenty Songs of the Century (Bell, 1974)
 Jay Leonhart, Great Duets (Chiaroscuro, 1999)
 Herbie Mann, The Roar of the Greasepaint, the Smell of the Crowd (Atlantic, 1965)
 Susannah McCorkle, How Do You Keep the Music Playing? (1986)
 Susannah McCorkle, Dream (Pausa, 1987)
 Charles McPherson, Charles McPherson (Mainstream, 1971)
 Bette Midler, Some People's Lives (Atlantic, 1990)
 Tony Mottola, A Latin Love-in (Project 3, 1967)
 Mark Murphy, Satisfaction Guaranteed (Muse, 1980)
 Gerry Niewood, Facets (Native Language, 2004)
 Duke Pearson, Prairie Dog (Atlantic, 1966)
 Doc Severinsen, The Great Arrival! (Command, 1969)
 Marlena Shaw, From the Depths of My Soul (Blue Note, 1973)
 Wayne Shorter, Odyssey of Iska (Blue Note, 1971)
 Lonnie Liston Smith, Renaissance (RCA Victor, 1976)
 Lonnie Liston Smith, Watercolors (BMG/Novus/RCA 1991)
 Sonny Stitt, When Sonny Blows (Blue Jamal 1970)
 Harvie Swartz, In a Different Light (Bluemoon, 1990)
 Sylvia Syms, She Loves to Hear the Music (A&M, 1978)
 Clark Terry, Clark Terry Sextet (Cameo, 1962)
 Clark Terry, Tread Ye Lightly (Cameo, 1964)
 Toots Thielemans, Toots (Command, ABC 1968)
 Toku, Chemistry of Love (Sony, 2002)
 Michal Urbaniak, Jam at Sandy's (Jam, 1981)
 Michal Urbaniak, My One and Only Love (SteepleChase, 1982)
 Grover Washington Jr., All the King's Horses (Kudu, 1972)
 Harold Wheeler, Black Cream (RCA Victor, 1975)
 Nancy Wilson, But Beautiful (Capitol, 1989)
 Paul Winter Consort, The Winter Consort (A&M, 1968)
 Paul Winter, Something in the Wind (A&M, 1969)

References

External links
Tritone Jazz Fantasy Camps
Audio interview with Gene Bertoncini
New York Times review of Gene Bertoncini
WPUNJ.edu

1937 births
Living people
American jazz guitarists
Musicians from New York City
Notre Dame School of Architecture alumni
Eastman School of Music faculty
New York University faculty
American male guitarists
20th-century American guitarists
Jazz musicians from New York (state)
20th-century American male musicians
American male jazz musicians
The Tonight Show Band members
Paul Winter Consort members
Motéma Music artists
Chiaroscuro Records artists
MPS Records artists
Concord Records artists